Navneet Education Limited is an Indian company that is in the business of educational and children book publishing, scholastic stationery and non-paper stationery products. It operates in three segments: publication, stationery and others. Its products are Navneet, Vikas, Gala, YOUVA. It produces titles in the children and general book categories, which includes children activity, board, story, health, cooking, mehendi, and embroidery books. It has more than 5000 titles in English, Hindi, Marathi, Gujarati and other languages.

Corporate information
It was founded 1959 in Mumbai. In 1993, it became a public company and listed its shares on Bombay Stock Exchange and National Stock Exchange.
Presently the chairman is Kamlesh S. Vikamsey and the managing director is Gnanesh D. Gala. The joint managing director is Mr. Raju H. Gala.
The chief financial officer is Deepak Kaku and the company secretary is Amit Buch.
It has its registered office at Dadar, Mumbai, Maharashtra.

In 2016, Navneet acquired Britannica India's curriculum business for ₹ 88 crore.

References

1959 establishments in Bombay State
Companies based in Mumbai
Publishing companies established in 1959
Publishing companies of India
Companies listed on the National Stock Exchange of India
Companies listed on the Bombay Stock Exchange